Teter Myers French House, also known as Peter Sperow House, is a historic home located near Hedgesville, Berkeley County, West Virginia. It was built in 1860 and is a two / three story, brick dwelling with a stone and brick foundation and hipped roof, situated on a hill. Also on the property is a wash house / root cellar used as slave quarters, corn crib, and barn built into a hillside.

It was listed on the National Register of Historic Places in 1980.

References

Houses on the National Register of Historic Places in West Virginia
Greek Revival houses in West Virginia
Houses completed in 1860
Houses in Berkeley County, West Virginia
National Register of Historic Places in Berkeley County, West Virginia
Slave cabins and quarters in the United States